Ash Code is an Italian dark wave band formed in 2014 in Napoli by the singer Alessandro Belluccio, the keyboardist Claudia Nottebella and the bass player Adriano Belluccio.
Ash Code music covers a wide range of genres including dark wave, post-punk, synth-pop and EBM.

History

Early days
In January 2014, "Dry your Eyes" and "Unnecessary Songs" were released online. Since the very beginning, they acquired attention from DJs and media from the Dark Wave scene thanks to their fresh sound that was still faithfully anchored in the 80's. In a matter of weeks, they signed with the Greek label Gehemnis Records for releasing a 7" single (300 numbered copies in June 2014)
and an extended mix of "Dry Your Eyes" was included in the third volume of  "Pagan Love Songs" compilation (compiled by Ralf Thyssen and Thomas Thyssen) alongside other important bands like She Past Away, Linea Aspera, The Chameleons, Psyche, Ulterior, Miserylab.  

A second digital single for the song "Empty Room" was released in June 2014 including the cover of "I can't escape myself" from The Sound as b-side.

'Oblivion' LP (2014)
On October 15, 2014, Ash Code released their first full-length album, ‘Oblivion’ on CD under the Swiss Dark Nights label. The concept of oblivion described by the band is interpreted possibility in accordance with Nietzschean philosophy, where forgetfulness was described as an active force to forget what one suffers and afflicts us without getting caught in a spiral of negative feelings and depression. It is one way to react positively to life, to avoid further pain and suffering. The work reached 2nd in the "Soundcheck" chart of  Sonic Seducer
 and it was described as feverish and restless debut, capable of translating the Icy Expressionist theme pairing with the abrasive sweep of the neo industrial; essentially 10 tracks between Dark Wave and black electro pop, succeeding at capturing the early days yet blending them into present time by means of modern Synthpop, catchy and tormented hints delivering one of the best Dark Wave albums of 2014.

A second press of the CD was released in May 2015 with inverted colours for the cover, as well as a vinyl version under the label Manic Drepression Records.

'Posthuman' LP (2016)
On 27 February 2016 their second LP "Posthuman" was released under the Swiss Dark Nights label. According to the band, we live in a posthuman era. It is an era of technology, of multiculturalism, of the transformation of every aspect of the world around us. In this radical change, the individual must relocate ethically, socially and politically while men must reformulate their values, with the understanding that they do not own the world but rather share it with other natural beings. The album reached the 2nd position in the "Soundcheck" chart of Sonic Seducer again  and was described as a hectic work of obsessive rhythm and markedly post-punk.

The sepulchral vocals and dark catchiness of the supporting melodies, being constantly on the edge of a glacial minimalism made the album pretty much reverberating electrogoth similar to other seminal bands such as Clan Of Xymox, Depeche Mode, The Sisters Of Mercy.
The band used minimal wave structures ultimately intended for the dance floor and adhered to the dandy apocalyptic manifesto claiming Gary Numan, Soft Cell and Neon as inspirational fathers.
Posthuman is also depicted as an album where the trio searches for new paths, personalizing the sound with 'noisy analog DIY synthesisers and instruments such as Mellotron and Theremin, 
being overall a more mature work and even more accessible than "Oblivion"
.

In April 2016 a vinyl version with inverted colours for the cover was released under the label Manic Depression Records.

During the last months of 2016 they start to remix songs from their favourite bands like Moby, Hante, She Past Away and Massive Ego.

'Perspektive' LP (2018) 
On May 18, 2018, the band released the third album "Perspektive” on Swiss Dark Nights / Manic Depression Records.
The LP reached the first position in the “Soundcheck” chart of Sonic Seducer and was selected as "Album of the month" too.

During September 2018 the band announces to have signed with Metropolis Records and every record is reprinted on Cd and vinyl in exclusive editions for the North and South America during the autumn of 2018.

Corona Virus days + 'Fear' EP (2020/2022)
On 14 February 2020, a remix of 'She' from Clan Of Xymox was released.
The arrival of the Coronavirus destroyed all the band's plans, a LATAM tour in July 2020 was cancelled and a USA tour scheduled for September 2020 too, but the band did not lose heart and was among the first ones to experiment a live streaming from home in March, raising funds for a local hospital.

Thanks to the success of the initiative, the band has been at the forefront working for the organization of the Gothicat Festivals, a series of charity online festivals made with contributions from the best bands of the darkwave/goth scene.

On 19 March 2021 'Fear' EP was released, the work includes three brand new songs and remixes by Clan Of Xymox, Molchat Doma and Forever Grey.
The EP was presented during a live in streaming performance featuring Mike Dudley(The Sound ), Eric 13( Combichrist ) and Jon Siren( Iamx, Front Line Assembly, Psyclon Nine, Dismantled )

In December 2021 the band released a cover of the famous Bauhaus's song "All We Ever Wanted Was Everything" as a tribute to the English band.

On 28th October 2022 the American skateboarding lifestyle brand  Supreme (brand) used "Sand" song for a promotional video on their social media.

Live performances

The band toured Europe, USA, Latin America, Russia, viting 27 different countries and sharing the stage with important bands of the scene such as Gang of Four,  Lebanon Hanover, Clan of Xymox, She Past Away, Cold Cave,  Mr.Kitty, Boy Harsher, Drab Majesty, The Soft Moon, Twin Tribes, Kælan Mikla, Selofan, Front Line Assembly, Hante, Covenant, Minuit Machine, Agent Side Grinder,  Trisomie 21, The Frozen Autumn, Skeletal Family,  Pink Turns Blue, Sigue Sigue Sputnik, New Model Army, Kirlian Camera,  The Invincible Spirit, Sixth June, Veil Of Light, Creux Lies and Wingtips.

They have also performed at festivals such as Wave-Gotik-Treffen (2015 and 2018),, Grauzone (2023),  Amphi Festival (2019 and 2022), Entremuralhas (2015), Castle Party (2019), Nocturnal Culture Night (2015 and 2017), W-Festival (2018), Dark Storm Festival (2018), Cold Hearted Festival (2022), Prague Gothic Treffen XIII (2018), E-Only (2020), Fekete Zaj Fesztivál (2019) and A Murder of Crows Festival (2019)

Name, sound and influences
The two words of the band's moniker have the initials A and C corresponding to those of the band members. They chose "Ash" in homage to the Vesuvius, the active volcano near Napoli and to Daniel Ash. "Code" was added to evoke something indefinite yet existentialist.
Their music is deeply influenced by early 80's tunes from bands like Depeche Mode and The Sisters of Mercy, a sound devoted to the drum machine, powerful synthesisers  and benefitting from the versatility of a Fender VI bass,
a formula previously used by New Order and The Cure.

Band members
Current members
Alessandro Belluccio - Vocals, Drum machine
Claudia Nottebella(Schoenenacht) – Synthesizer, Vocals
Adriano Belluccio – Fender VI

Discography

LP
Oblivion (2014) Swiss Dark Nights / Metropolis Records / Manic Depression Records / Icy Cold
Posthuman (2016) Swiss Dark Nights / Metropolis Records / Manic Depression Records
Perspektive (2018) Swiss Dark Nights / Metropolis Records / Manic Depression Records

EP
Fear (2021) Swiss Dark Nights

Singles 7"
Dry Your Eyes (2014) Gehemnis Records
Icy Cold (2017) Synth Religion

Live
Live Dark Entries (2016) Swiss Dark Nights
Live in Freiburg (with Hapax & Geometric Vision)(2017) Swiss Dark Nights
Part Time Punks Session(Live in Los Angeles)(2020) Swiss Dark Nights

Remixes made by Ash Code
She Past Away - Katarsis(Ash Code REMIX)  (2016)
Hante - Living In A French Movie(Ash Code REMIX)  (2016)
Moby - Are You Lost In The World Like Me?(Ash Code Remix)  (2017)
Massive Ego - For The Blood In Your Veins (Ash Code Remix)  (2017)
Antipole - Closer(Ash Code Remix)  (2018)
Holygram - Daria(Ash Code Remix)  (2018)
Euringer(Jimmy Urine/Mindless Self Indulgence side project) - Problematic(Ash Code Remix)  (2019)
SJÖBLOM - The Last Call(Ash Code Remix)  (2019)
RED INDUSTRIE - Körper Reich (Ash Code Remix) (2019)
JE T'AIME - Dance (Ash Code Remix)  (2020)
Clan of Xymox - She (Ash Code Remix)  (2020)
Porn - Low Winter Hope (Ash Code Remix)  (2020)
Chelsea Wolfe - Erde (Ash Code Remix)  (2020)
ELZ AND THE CULT - ULTRAVIOLENCE (Ash Code Remix)  (2020)
Clan of Xymox - All I ever know (Ash Code Remix)  (2020)
Geometric Vision - Slowemotion (Ash Code Remix)  (2020)
undertheskin - End This Summer (Ash Code Remix)  (2020)
Agent Side Grinder - Inner Noises (Ash Code Remix)  (2020)
Twin Tribes - Fantasmas (Ash Code Remix)  (2021)
Whispers in the shadow - Passion Project (Ash Code Remix ) (2021)
Bestial Mouths - The Bleed (Ash Code Remix ) (2021)
Elektroforez - Зло (Ash Code Remix) (2021)
 This Eternal Decay - (Ash Code Remix) (2021)
Nürnberg - Abdymi (Ash Code Remix) (2021)
Neila Invo - Murder's Prayer (Ash Code Remix) (2021)
Wires And Lights - Drive (Ash Code Remix) (2021)

Remixes of Ash Code's songs
 Oblivion - Minuit Machine Remix (2014) 
 Dry your eyes - Ken Utterson Remix  (2014)
 Unnecessary Songs - Tr80R remix (2014)
 Nite Rite - Delphine Coma Remix (2016)
 Tide - Orax Remix (2016)
 Posthuman - Electrogenic Remix 82016)  
 Alone In Your Dance - Emerson Dracon Remix (2016)
 Disease - Hante Remix (2018)
 Perspektive - We Are Temporary Remix (2018)
 If You Were Here - She Pleasures Herself Remix (2018)
 Glow - Agent Side Grinder Remix (2018)
 Perspektive - The Ne-21 Remix (2018)
 Icy Cold - Selfishadows Remix (2018)
 Fear - Clan Of Xymox Remix (2021)
 Fear - Molchat Doma Remix (2021)
 Fear - Forever Grey Remix (2021)

Videography
Dry Your Eyes (2014)
Empty Room (2014)
Oblivion (2014) 
Crucified (2015)
Nite Rite (2015) 
Tide (2016) 
Posthuman (2016)
Icy Cold (2017)
Perspektive (2018)
Black Gloves (2018)
Disease (2019)
1981 (2020)
Fear (2021)
Fear - Clan Of Xymox Remix (2021)
Fear - Molchat Doma Remix (2021)
All We Ever Wanted Was Everything (2021)

References

External links
Official website
Official Youtube Page
Ash Code on Discogs

Italian dark wave musical groups
Musical groups established in 2014
2014 establishments in Italy